Susan Westrom (born May 15, 1952) is an American politician who served in the Kentucky House of Representatives from 1999 to 2022.

Personal life
Born in Iowa on May 15, 1952, by the mid-1980s Susan Westrom was a single parent of two children.  After attending Lexington Community College at age 32, Westrom received a bachelor's (1993) and master's degree (1995) in social work from the University of Kentucky.

Career
Before entering politics, Westrom was the director of advocacy and marketing for the Buckhorn Children's Home as well as a real estate agent with Keller Williams Bluegrass.

Politics
Westrom was first elected to represent District 79 in the Kentucky House of Representatives in 1998.  In the 2016 Kentucky House of Representatives election for District 79, Westrom defeated Ken Kearns with 59.4% of the 20,064 votes cast (11,909–8,155).  She won the 2020 Kentucky House of Representatives election for her district, defeating Jon Larson, who conceded the race in-person at Westrom's Lexington home.  , the Democratic representative was on ten legislative committees.

In the Kentucky legislature, Westrom worked towards removing juveniles from adult prisons, promoting the equine industry in Kentucky, facilitating families' access to Kentucky Housing Corporation benefits, and improving electric utility accountability.

After no Republicans filed to run against her, and being comfortable with her likely successor, Westrom announced her withdrawal from the 2022 election on February 10, 2022.  She planned to serve the rest of her term through the end of the year.  Chad Aull won his primary election in a "landslide", and being unopposed in the general, was elected to Westrom's seat.

References

External links
 

1952 births
20th-century American politicians
20th-century American women politicians
21st-century American politicians
21st-century American women politicians
Democratic Party members of the Kentucky House of Representatives
living people
University of Kentucky alumni
women state legislators in Kentucky